Joseph Douglas Collister (born 15 December 1991) is an English former professional footballer who played as a goalkeeper. He played in the Football League with Tranmere Rovers before dropping into semi-professional and amateur football. He currently plays for West Cheshire League team Heswall.

Playing career

Tranmere Rovers
Born in Wirral, Merseyside, Collister started his career with Tranmere Rovers when he signed a two-year professional contract with the club on 23 July 2009, where he had graduated from the Rovers' Centre of Excellence.

Collister was primarily used as understudy to on-loan West Bromwich Albion goalkeeper Luke Daniels. However, following an injury to Daniels on 12 September 2009, Collister came on as a second-half substitute, and in doing so made his Tranmere Rovers debut, in a League One fixture in which the club lost 3–2 at home to Walsall.

Collister went on to make a total of 14 appearances with Tranmere, but following the end of his two-year contract, manager Les Parry decided to release Collister at the end of the 2010–11 season.

Tamworth
Following a successful trial period, Collister signed for Conference National side Tamworth in August 2011, signing a one-year contract. He joined Barwell on a one-month loan on 24 September along with Lee Weemes and Luke Shearer.

Collister made his debut for Tamworth on 1 January 2012 in a 2–2 draw with Alfreton Town. Later that month he went on loan to Altrincham. He made his debut in a 2–0 defeat away at Gainsbrough trinity, saving a penalty and winning man of the match award.

In late March he joined Fleetwood Town on loan until the end of the season.

AFC Telford United
On 31 August 2012, Collister joined AFC Telford United on a one-year-deal.

He was released to free up space for Telford to bring in more players on 5 February 2013

Altrincham
He rejoined former club Altrincham until the end of the 2012–2013 season.

Heswall
After leaving Altrincham, Collister joined West Cheshire League team Heswall.

Personal life
Collister attended Hilbre High School in Newton, West Kirby, Wirral until the age of 16.

References

External links

1991 births
Living people
Sportspeople from Wirral
English footballers
Association football goalkeepers
Tranmere Rovers F.C. players
Tamworth F.C. players
Barwell F.C. players
Altrincham F.C. players
Fleetwood Town F.C. players
AFC Telford United players
Heswall F.C. players
English Football League players
National League (English football) players
Footballers from Merseyside